The Robotic Lunar Observatory (ROLO) is an astronomical observatory funded by NASA and located at the United States Geological Survey Flagstaff Science Campus atop McMillan Mesa in Flagstaff, Arizona. Its purpose is to enable the Moon to be used as a radiometric calibration reference for Earth-orbiting remote-sensing spacecraft instruments.  The ROLO project is currently ongoing, but the program ceased observations in September 2003. The facility is maintained for calibration and instrument characterization purposes. It consists of two  Ritchey-Chrétien telescopes attached to an equatorial mount made by DFM Engineering.  One telescope is fitted with a sensor optimized for visible and near-infrared (VNIR) wavelengths, while the other is tuned to short-wavelength infrared (SWIR). The VNIR camera began operations in 1995 and the SWIR camera in 1997.

See also
 Lowell Observatory
 Astrogeology Research Program
 List of astronomical observatories

References

External links
 USGS Astrogeology Science Center
 USGS Flagstaff Science Campus

Astronomical observatories in Arizona
Buildings and structures in Flagstaff, Arizona
Defunct astronomical observatories